Medabots, known in Japan as , is a Japanese role-playing video game franchise created by Rin Horuma (Horumarin) and currently owned by Imagineer. The main series of RPGs focus on collecting and battling with the titular robots. The bulk of the games releases have been on Nintendo platforms, including the Game Boy, GameCube, and the DS, and 3DS handhelds.

The series was adapted into a Japanese anime television series spanning two adaptations. The first was animated by Bee Train while the second, Medarot Damashii, was animated by Production I.G. The television series originally aired on TV Tokyo from July 2, 1999 to March 30, 2001. Both series were originally licensed and localized into English by Nelvana and were broadcast on YTV in Canada and Fox Kids and ABC Family in the United States from 2001 to 2004.

A manga series, written by Rin Horuma, was also produced. It was serialized in the children's magazine Comic BomBom in Japan and then published into collected volumes by Kodansha. The manga based on the first game, Medarot, was never translated into English, but the manga based on the sequel, Medarot 2, was licensed for an English language release in North America by Viz Media, simply under the title Medabots. Medarot 2, 3, and 4, have also been translated into English for distribution in Singapore by Chuang Yi.

To date, only Medabots (a remake of Medarot 2 for Game Boy Advance), Medabots AX, and Medabots Infinity have been released in North America. There have also been plastic models produced by Kotobukiya.

A compilation game Medarot Classics Plus was released on November 12, 2020. It features the Kabuto and Kuwagata versions of the first eight mainline games.

Plot

Medabots
The series centers around Medabots, artificially intelligent robots, whose purpose is to serve humans in a future time. The series begins with a ten-year-old (nine in the Japanese version) boy named Ikki Tenryō, who wants to become a champion of the World Robattle Tournament. However, Ikki is unable to afford a Medabot, and his parents refuse to buy him one. However, he manages to get enough money to buy an outdated model, and, with a bit of luck, he finds a medal in a river. Ikki quickly inserts it into the Medabot he purchased named Metabee. The only problem is that the medal he found gives Metabee a severe attitude problem (a problem rarely seen in a Medabot), which leads Ikki to think he is defective. However, this theory is proven wrong later in the series, as it is revealed that Metabee actually has a rare medal.

The rare medals were kept secret by the Medabot Corporation, as very little was known about them. However, a Medabot with a rare medal would be able to call upon an attack called the "Medaforce". In the manga, the Medaforce is a form of medal mind control, as explained by Dr. Aki in the third graphic novel of Medabots. In the cartoon however, it is shown as a way of increasing the power of the Medabot's special skill into a focused beam attack.

Another important aspect is the story of Henry, the store clerk who sold Ikki  Metabee. It is revealed that he is, quite obviously, Phantom Renegade. A running gag of the series was Henry almost telling everyone he is The Phantom, with no one ever discovering this fact. Space Medafighter X is introduced, who is another one of Henry's secret identities, the number one medafighter in Japan. Later, during the World Finals, he rarely shows up to the fights, instead sending substitutes and working behind the scenes. This being because he supposedly started The Ten Days of Darkness, which occurred eight years before the events in the series during the World Robattle Cup when Henry fought as Hikaru Agata with the original Metabee (however, the medal was different). The Medabots went on a rampage during the Ten Days of Darkness, which stopped when Henry was forced to kill his Medabot by destroying his medal.

At the end of the second season, it is revealed that Victor (a medafighter for Team Kenya and Warbandit's owner) was helping Dr. Meta-evil to get medals during the tournament. During the finals, Metabee and Warbandit continue to fight, even with their partners lost and their bodies damaged. It is during this event that Dr. Meta-evil starts his plan using Metabee and Warbandit's medals; trapping them both in a dream. However, Ikki manages to get Metabee to wake up from the dream, while the other medabots, free now, help Metabee to fight against Dr. Meta-evil. Ikki must also stop the plans of the nefarious "RubberRobo Gang".

Later in the series, Medabots are found to be actually thousands of years old; remnants of an ancient civilization who called themselves Medalorians. The Medalorians were obsessed with war, and to become more effective warriors they fastened metal armor to themselves. However, their wars decimated the civilization, and the survivors coded their memories onto hexagonal pieces of metal. These, "Medals", cloned and mass-produced by the Medabot Corporation (a corporation founded by Dr. Aki), are the Medabot equivalent of a brain and soul. The original medals, referred to as rare medals, are kept in storage because of the extreme power they have.

Medarot Damashii (Medabots Spirits)
Medarot Damashii, a sequel to the original series, follows Ikki and Metabee, as they face a new challenge following the events of the original series.  Kam Kamazaki, a twelve-year-old boy, has designed one of the most dangerous medabots in the entire story, called Kilobots (or Death Medarot, in the Japanese version), who use the X-Medal. These Kilobots have no feelings, since the emotion part of the Medabot medal has been removed, and more strength parts have been replaced instead, and can break the rules in order to win a fight.  Because they have no personality, the Medaforce is useless against them.  In the first episode, Ikki loses a Robattle  to Ginkai and his Kilobot when it cheats and reloads. But he soon meets Nae, a Medabot mechanic and Dr. Aki's granddaughter, who gives Ikki new medaparts in order to defeat the kilobot through using a new feature called Action Mode (later Demolition Mode is introduced as well).  Throughout the season, Ikki, Erika and their new friend Zuru (who also masks as the Mystery Medafighter) battle several of Kam's friends and their Kilobots.  The Mystery Medfighter's ambition is to rid the world of Kilobots, with the help of his medabot Roks.  Eventually, Ginkai re-discovers the true spirit of medafighting and ceases being a rogue medafighter and returns to using Medabots. Eventually Kam realizes the error of his ways and stops trying to develop stronger and more dangerous Kilobots, choosing to remain with his Kilobot Blackbettle, who has a personality installed into her medal.

The series is often criticized for the removal of several supporting characters such as Henry/Hikaru Agata/Phantom Renegade/Space Medafighter X and Arcbeetle, Rokusho, Koji and Sumilidon, Rintaro and Kantaroth, Karin and Neutranurse, Victor and Warbandit, Mr. Referee, the Rubberrobo Gang and the Chick Salesman, as well as for the fact that many of the new Kilobots and Medabots are simply slightly modified versions of the original series without relation to the original characters: Roks (Rokusho), Exor (Sumilidon), Arcdash (Arcbeetle), Unitrix (Warbandit).

Characters
 Ikki Tenryou (天領イッキ Tenryō Ikki), is a lively and easygoing boy, although a bit timid, he is the main protagonist of the series. At first Ikki is unable to afford a Medabot. But after finding a medal in a river, he manages to buy a model, which is named Metabee. However, the medal he found appears to be defective, as Metabee is short-tempered and disobedient. In spite of this, a strong bond grows between them after several robattles. Though Ikki is not a full-fledged Medafighter, he gradually matures through the Robattles he engages in. He is voiced by Michiru Yamazaki in the Japanese version, Samantha Reynolds in the English translation of the first series, and Julie Lemieux in the Spirits anime.
  is the main antihero of the series, a Medabot belonging to Ikki Tenryou. Metabee is a beetle type Medabot, specializing in revolver tactics. He possesses a rare medal that allows him to access the Medaforce. Metabee is known to be a rebellious and arrogant Medabot who often causes problems due to his headstrong personality. He is often sarcastic to his owner Ikki, but he shares a close bond with him, and so Ikki trusts him deeply. In the English version he is voiced by Joseph Motiki.

Media

Video games
Most games in the series come in two versions: Kabuto (lit. Rhinoceros Beetle), in which your starting Medabot's design is based on a Japanese rhinoceros beetle (a "KBT type" Medabot), and Kuwagata, in which it is based on a stag beetle ("KWG type"). Differences beyond the starting Medabot also exist, such as which Medabot parts the player is able to collect, and minor story differences. Medarot R, Medabots Infinity, and the Parts Collection games were only titles to not have been released in two versions.

Main series
The main series entries, except Medabots DS, are all numbered.

Spinoffs and side games
Several spinoffs have been produced, some sticking closer to the RPG formula of the main series while others branch out into other genres.

For Medarot 1, 2, R, and 3, supplementary games entitled Parts Collection were made. These are shorter games with less complicated stories, focusing mostly on battles. Their main draw is that the player is able to collect robot parts and other items within the Parts Collection games and transfer them to their respective main series titles.

Manga

Written by Horumarin, the Medabots manga series was originally serialized in the Kodansha's children's magazine Comic BomBom from 1997 to 2003. Six series were published. The first series Medarot was published between 1997 and 1999 and compiled in three tankōbon volumes. The second series entitled Medarot 2 was published between 1999 and 2000 and compiled in 4 volumes. This series was licensed for an English language release in North America by Viz Media under the title Medabots. the third series Medarot 3 was released between 2000 and 2001 and compiled in two volumes. The fourth series Medarot 4 was published in 2001 and compiled in two volumes. The fifth series Medarot 5 was published between 2001 and 2002 and compiled in two volumes. The sixth series Medarot G was released in 2003 and compiled in two volumes.

Anime

The Medabots anime series was adapted from Medarot 2, with its robotic combat elements inspired by Plawres Sanshiro. Produced by NAS and TV Tokyo and animated by Bee Train, the fifty-two episode series originally aired on TV Tokyo from July 2, 1999 until June 30, 2000. A thirty-nine episode sequel to the anime series that was animated by Production I.G, Medarot Damashii (Unofficially known in English as Medabots Spirits) aired from July 7, 2000 to March 30, 2001.

The Japanese version has received a VHS and DVD release of the first series, while the second series has only received a VHS release. On January 29, 2010, a Region 2 boxset release known as Medabot DVD BOX 1 was released containing the first thirty episodes, with a second boxset on February 19 finishing with the last twenty-two episodes. Two boxsets for Damashii were released on December 30, 2010. This was the Production I.G series' very first DVD release.

Both series were licensed and localized into English by Canadian entertainment company Nelvana; the first series was divided into two American seasons. The first U.S. season originally aired on the Fox Broadcasting Company's Fox Kids block from September 1, 2001 to April 27, 2002. Medabots was Fox Kids highest-rated new series at the time. As a result of the sale of Fox Family Worldwide (the joint venture with Saban Entertainment that previously operated the Fox Kids program block) to The Walt Disney Company, Medabots would begin airing on ABC Family on March 4, 2002. The second U.S. season first aired on ABC Family from July 1 to November 2, 2002, while Damashii first aired on the network from September 13, 2003 to May 8, 2004 with later episodes aired as part of the Jetix program block. In Canada, the television series aired on YTV which, along with Nelvana, were owned by Corus Entertainment.

Under the license of Nelvana, the series was released on 12-volume VHS and DVD by ADV Films from 2002 to 2003 that ran throughout the first 52 episodes, along with the first three volumes re-released under ADV Kidz in their Essential Anime DVD lineup in 2005. Distribution was transferred to Shout! Factory, where they've released the first 26 episodes on a 4-DVD box set, that was released in early 2008. Announced at Otakon 2019, Discotek Media released the anime on SD Blu-ray, starting with the first 26 episodes of the English dub with optional closed captions on December 24, 2019. The company also announced plans to release the Japanese version in the future. On June 11, 2020, Justin Sevakis said Discotek Media were unable to find the masters for the English version of Medabots Spirits which has prevented the anime from being released on home video in North America. Discotek Media asked fans to help find the masters. On September 15, 2020, it was announced “acceptable” masters have been recovered and would have a physical release. It was released on May 25, 2021.

See also
 List of Japanese role-playing game franchises

References

External links
 Official Website
 Medabots in anime-paradijs  Dutch
 
 
 Project Rising Beetle localization campaign

1999 anime television series debuts
2000 anime television series debuts
2001 Japanese television series endings
Japanese children's animated action television series
Japanese children's animated adventure television series
Japanese children's animated science fiction television series
ADV Films
Anime television series based on video games
Bee Train Production
Children's manga
Discotek Media
Fox Broadcasting Company original programming
Fox Kids
Imagineer games
Natsume (company) games
Production I.G
Television series by Nelvana
TV Tokyo original programming
Video games about robots
Video game franchises introduced in 1997
Viz Media manga